St. Peter and St. Paul Church is the oldest Orthodox church surviving in Riga, the capital of Latvia. The church is situated at the address Citadeles iela 7.

The church was built in the 1780s and served the Russian garrison stationed in the Riga Citadel. The Soviet regime turned it into the "Ave Sol" concert hall. In 2012 the building was returned to the Latvian Orthodox Church.

References 

18th-century churches in Latvia
18th-century Eastern Orthodox church buildings
Churches in Riga
Eastern Orthodox churches in Latvia
Latvian Orthodox Church